"I Don't Give A" is a song recorded by Swedish singer Lisa Ajax. The song was released as a digital download in Sweden on 26 February 2017 and peaked at number 25 on the Swedish Singles Chart. It is taking part in Melodifestivalen 2017, and qualified to andra chansen from the second semi-final on 11 February 2017. The song qualified from andra chansen on 4 March 2017. It was written by Ola Svensson, Linnea Deb, Joy Deb, and Anton Hård af Segerstad.

Track listing

Chart performance

Release history

References

2017 singles
2016 songs
Lisa Ajax songs
Melodifestivalen songs of 2017
Universal Music Group singles
Songs written by Linnea Deb
Songs written by Joy Deb
Songs written by Anton Hård af Segerstad
English-language Swedish songs